PCL-09, exported as CS/SH1, is a truck-mounted self-propelled howitzer artillery system used by the military forces of the People's Republic of China. The armoured fighting vehicle is developed by Norinco and was first commissioned in 2009 with a 122mm gun-howitzer using projectiles with a range of 27 km and a firing rate of 6-8 rounds per minute. Mounted on a Shaanxi SX2150 6×6 truck, it is also equipped with the BeiDou Navigation Satellite System. It was used for the first time during a military exercise Shanghai Cooperation Organisation in 2010.

Operators 

 People's Liberation Army Ground Force: 300 units as of 2020.
 Rwanda
 Rwanda Defence Force
 Cambodia

 Royal Cambodian Armed Forces

See also 
 PCL-161, the successor of PCL-09.

References 

Self-propelled artillery of the People's Republic of China
Wheeled_self-propelled_howitzers
Military vehicles introduced in the 2000s